is a Japanese sports shooter. He competed in the men's 50 metre rifle, prone event at the 1976 Summer Olympics.

References

1940 births
Living people
Japanese male sport shooters
ISSF rifle shooters
Olympic shooters of Japan
Shooters at the 1976 Summer Olympics
Shooters at the 1974 Asian Games
Shooters at the 1978 Asian Games
Asian Games medalists in shooting
Asian Games gold medalists for Japan
Asian Games bronze medalists for Japan
Medalists at the 1974 Asian Games
Place of birth missing (living people)
20th-century Japanese people
21st-century Japanese people